Tofenacin is an antidepressant drug with a tricyclic-like structure which was developed and marketed in the United Kingdom and Italy in 1971 and 1981, respectively, by Brocades-Stheeman & Pharmacia (now part of Astellas Pharma). It acts as a serotonin-norepinephrine reuptake inhibitor, and based on its close relation to orphenadrine, may also possess anticholinergic and antihistamine properties.  Tofenacin is also the major active metabolite of orphenadrine and likely plays a role in its beneficial effects against depressive symptoms seen in Parkinson's disease patients.

See also
 Clemastine
 Orphenadrine
 Tiazesim

References

Abandoned drugs
Amines
Astellas Pharma
Antidepressants
Ethers
Muscarinic antagonists
Serotonin–norepinephrine reuptake inhibitors
2-Tolyl compounds